Ralph Lewis "Jake" Lanum (September 13, 1896 – March 19, 1968) was a professional American football player who played running back for five seasons for the Chicago Bears and its predecessors the Decatur Staleys and the Chicago Staleys.

Lanum was a starting fullback and also handled some kicking duties on the 1919 Illinois Fighting Illini football National Championship team.

After football, Lanum moved to Hammond, Indiana, working mostly in the oil industry. In retirement he returned to Illinois, living in Homewood, where he died in 1968 at the age of 71.

References

External links
Jake Lanum Bio (Staley Museum)

1896 births
1968 deaths
American football running backs
Decatur Staleys players
Chicago Staleys players
Chicago Bears players
Illinois Fighting Illini football players
People from Carmi, Illinois
People from Hammond, Indiana
People from Homewood, Illinois